Rauvolfia sumatrana is a tree in the family Apocynaceae.

Description
The bark is grey, yellowish grey, greenish yellow or brown. Inflorescences bear up to 35 or more flowers. The flowers feature a white corolla.

Distribution and habitat
Rauvolfia sumatrana is native to China, India, Burma, Thailand, Vietnam and Malesia. It is found in a variety of habitats, mostly lowland.

References

sumatrana
Flora of China
Flora of tropical Asia
Plants described in 1820